The 1996 AFL Ansett Australia Cup was the Australian Football League competition played in its entirety before the Australian Football League's 1996 Premiership Season began. It culminated the final in March 1996. The AFL Ansett Australia Cup is also sometimes referred to as the pre-season cup because it was played in its entirety before the Premiership Season began since 1988.

Games

Round of 16

|- style="background:#ccf;"
| Home team
| Home team score
| Away team
| Away team score
| Ground
| Crowd
| Date
| Time
|- style="background:#fff;"
| Adelaide
| 18.16 (124)
| Melbourne
| 10.5 (65)
| Football Park 
| 24,143
| Friday 23 February 1996
| 8:00 pm
|- style="background:#fff;"
| Hawthorn
| 9.19 (73)
| St. Kilda
| 19.13 (127)
| Waverley Park
| 16,061
| Saturday, 24 February 1996
| 8:00 pm
|- style="background:#fff;"
| Fremantle
| 7.15 (57)
| West Coast
| 10.11 (71)
| Marrara Oval
| 9,078
| Sunday, 25 February 1996 
| 7:05 pm
|- style="background:#fff;"
| Fitzroy
| 12.15 (87)
| Footscray
| 16.15 (111)
| Waverley Park
| 4,818
| Monday, 26 February 1996
| 8:00 pm
|- style="background:#fff;"
| Collingwood
| 14.10 (94)
| Richmond
| 8.14 (62)
| Waverley Park
| 13,307
| Wednesday 28 February 1996 
| 8:00 pm
|- style="background:#fff;"
| Sydney
| 20.8 (128)
| North Melbourne
| 22.18 (150)
| Bruce Stadium
| 9,405
| Saturday, 2 March 1996
| 2:00 pm
|- style="background:#fff;"
| Carlton
| 14.12 (96)
| Essendon
| 8.14 (62)
| Waverley Park
| 23,837
| Saturday, 2 March 1996
| 8:00 pm
|- style="background:#fff;"
| Brisbane
| 14. 25 (109)
| Geelong
| 9.9 (63)
| The Gabba
| 18,325
| Monday, 4 March 1996
| 7:00 pm

Quarter-finals

|- style="background:#ccf;"
| Home team
| Home team score
| Away team
| Away team score
| Ground
| Crowd
| Date
| Time
|- style="background:#fff;"
| Adelaide
| 11.10 (76)
| St. Kilda
| 18.11 (119)
| Football Park
| 21,276
| Sunday, 3 March 1996
| 8:00 pm
|- style="background:#fff;"
| West Coast
| 11.6 (72)
| Footscray
| 8.10 (58)
| Waverley Park
| 3,109
| Wednesday, 6 March 1996
| 8:00 pm
|- style="background:#fff;"
| Collingwood
| 15.9 (99)
| Carlton
| 16.8 (104)
| Waverley Park
| 33,359
| Saturday, 9 March 1996
| 8:00 pm
|- style="background:#fff;"
| North Melbourne
| 15.15 (105)
| Brisbane
| 13.12 (90)
| The Gabba
| 13,269
| Sunday, 10 March 1996
| 7:00 pm

Semi-finals

|- style="background:#ccf;"
| Home team
| Home team score
| Away team
| Away team score
| Ground
| Crowd
| Date
| Time
|- style="background:#fff;"
|  St. Kilda
| 10.13 (73)
| West Coast
| 8.9 (57)
| Waverley Park
| 10,019
| Wednesday 13 March 1996 
| 8:00 pm
|- style="background:#fff;"
| Carlton
| 10.12 (72)
| North Melbourne 
| 5.14 (44)
| Waverley Park
| 12,306
| Saturday, 16 March 1996
| 8:00 pm

Final

|- style="background:#ccf;"
| Home team
| Home team score
| Away team
| Away team score
| Ground
| Crowd
| Date
| Time
|- style="background:#fff;"
| St. Kilda
| 20.10 (130)
| Carlton
| 10.12 (72)
| Waverley Park
| 66,888
| Saturday 23 March 1996
| 8:05 pm

Knock-Out Chart

Scorecard

1996 AFL Ansett Australia Cup final Teams

St Kilda Football Club

Carlton Football Club

Final Placings 

1. St Kilda 
2. Carlton 
3. West Coast 
4. North Melbourne 
5. Collingwood 
6. Brisbane 
7. Footscray 
8. Adelaide 
9. Sydney 
10. Fremantle 
11. Fitzroy 
12. Richmond 
13. Essendon 
14. Geelong 
15. Hawthorn 
16. Melbourne

See also

List of Australian Football League night premiers
1996 AFL season

References

Ansett Australia Cup, 1996
Australian Football League pre-season competition